Vladimir Klimov is a Soviet sprint canoer who competed in the early 1970s. He won a bronze medal in the K-4 10000 m event at the 1971 ICF Canoe Sprint World Championships in Belgrade.

References

Living people
Soviet male canoeists
Year of birth missing (living people)
ICF Canoe Sprint World Championships medalists in kayak